Xuereb is a Maltese surname.

The Xuereb surname is mentioned by Charles A. Gauci in his book The Genealogy and Heraldry of the Noble Families of Malta. He writes that the earliest references of this family are in 1517, with Tommeo Xuereb mentioned as "Nobile" or "Noble".

Notable people with the surname include:

 Aaron Xuereb (born 1979), Maltese footballer
 Alfred Xuereb (born 1958), Maltese Catholic cleric, Vatican official
Anthony Xuereb (born 1970), Australian rugby league player
 Daniel Xuereb (born 1959), French footballer
Janice Xuereb (born 1996), Maltese footballer
 Martin Xuereb (born 1968), Commander of the Armed Forces of Malta
 Paul Xuereb (1923–1994), Maltese politician
 Pierre-Henri Xuereb (born 1959), French violist
 Raymond Xuereb (born 1952), Maltese footballer

Maltese-language surnames